Michael or Mike Nelson may refer to:

 Michael Nelson (novelist) (1921–1990), British novelist
 Michael Nelson (political scientist) (born 1949), American professor
 Mike Nelson (Minnesota politician) (born 1954), member of the Minnesota House of Representatives
 Michael J. Nelson (born 1964), American writer and performer, best known for work on Mystery Science Theater 3000
 Mike Nelson (artist) (born 1967), British installation artist
 Michael James Nelson (born 1979), American comedian, writer and producer
 Michael Nelson (footballer) (born 1980), British footballer
 Michael P. Nelson, American writer, teacher, speaker, consultant, and professor 
 Michael Chaim Nelson, New York City councilman
 Michael Alan Nelson, writer of several comics from Boom! Studios
 Banners (musician), English musician Michael Nelson performing as Banners
 Michael Nelson (soccer, born 1994), American soccer player
 Michael Nelson (soccer, born 1995), American soccer player
 Michael R. Nelson, North Carolina politician
 Goodspaceguy, American perennial candidate

Fictional
 Mike Nelson (character), played by Michael J. Nelson on Mystery Science Theater 3000
 Mike Nelson (Twin Peaks), a character in the TV series Twin Peaks
 Mike Nelson, the lead character (played by Lloyd Bridges) in the TV series Sea Hunt

See also

 Kumantje Jagamara (1946–2020), Australian artist, also known as Michael Nelson Tjakamarra and other variations